Maryborough is a town in Victoria, Australia, on the Pyrenees Highway,  north of Ballarat and  northwest of Melbourne, in the Shire of Central Goldfields. At the 2016 census, it had a population of 7,921.

History
The area was originally inhabited by the Dja Dja Wurrung people. The first Europeans to settle there were the Simson brothers, who established a sheep station, known as Charlotte Plains, in 1840. In 1854, gold was discovered at White Hill, four kilometres north of Maryborough, attracting a rush of prospectors to the area. At its peak, Maryborough reportedly had a population of up to 50,000, although local historian Betty Osborn, of Maryborough-Midlands Historical Society Inc., claims it was closer to 30,000.

The town site was surveyed in 1854, with a police camp, Methodist church, and hospital amongst the first infrastructure. The post office opened on 19 October 1854.

The settlement, originally known as Simsons, was renamed Maryborough by gold commissioner James Daly after his Irish birthplace. One of Victoria's earliest newspapers, The Maryborough Advertiser, was established in 1854. Land sales commenced in 1856, and Maryborough became the area's administrative and commercial centre. It became a borough in 1857.

The last gold mine in Maryborough closed in 1918. In 1924 the Maryborough Knitting Mills opened, establishing the town as a centre for the wool industry. Maryborough became a city in 1961.

Climate
Maryborough enjoys a temperate climate with four distinct seasons and is typically dry and mild. The mean minimum January temperature  with the maximum a balmy , however temperatures above  are commonly recorded during the summer months.
Although the city experiences little snow due to its low elevation, frosts are common during the colder winter months.

The city averages  rainfall annually, with a slightly more rainfall falling in the second half of the year, generally only experienced in short bursts of showers, rather than extended periods of rainfall. The dryness of the area, due to poor topographical features places significant pressure on water reserves. Maryborough ended of one of the longest droughts on record during the 2010/2011 summer when it experience some of the highest rainfall on recorded which caused flooding throughout the local area. The city is currently on permanent water restrictions.

Bushfires
Maryborough has been threatened by bushfires on multiple occasions, most notably in January 1985 when a large fire devastated the surrounding area resulting in 3 deaths and 180 homes lost.

Demographics
According to the 2016 census, there are 7,921 people that reside in Maryborough. Like many regional centres, a high percentage of the population (83.1%) were born in Australia, with England (3.2%), New Zealand (0.7%) and Netherlands (0.5%) notable countries of birth outside Australia.

Technicians, trade workers and labourers (34.4%) make up the bulk of the workforce with Professionals, Sales Workers and Managers contributing to large portions of the city's employment base.

Churches
Just over 19% of the population describe themselves as Anglican, with 33.6% of the population claiming no religious affiliation. Catholics, Presbyterians, Salvation Army, Baptists and Australian Christian Churches also contribute to the Christian majority of the population.

Chaplains serve the Maryborough Community in Schools (Steve Emonson, MEC), the Hospital and at the Maryborough Football & Netball Club. James 'Jim' McMillan from Genesis Church is Maryborough's club chaplain.

Education
Maryborough has three schools:
Highview College
Maryborough Education Centre Years Prep–12 and specialist
St Augustine's Primary School Grades Prep–6

Culture
The town hosts a market on the first Sunday of each month, a Highland Gathering on New Year's Day (which has been held since 1857), the Golden Wattle Festival in August or September and the Australasian Goldpanning Championships in October or November.

Music
Maryborough has a number of community bands including the Maryborough City Brass Band, the Maryborough Big Band, the Maryborough and District Pipe Band and the well-known Maryborough Traditional Jazz Ensemble.

Media
The Maryborough Advertiser is the local newspaper in the Central Goldfields region, circulating to over 4000 homes. The 'Addy' as it's known locally, employs 13 local people. It is published every Tuesday and Friday. In 2015–2016 The Maryborough and District Advertiser celebrated 160 years as the printed voice of the local community.

In early February 2007 transmission of Goldfields FM 99.1 commenced.

Maryborough receives all the major free-to-air television stations (ABC, Prime7, WIN, SC10 and SBS), as well as all new digital channels (ABC2, ABC3, ABC News 24, SBS2, One HD, GO!, 7Two, eleven, 7Mate and gem). Prime7 and WIN are simply the regional affiliates of Channels Seven and Nine, and re-broadcast their network signals. There are slight differences however, as both Prime7 and WIN broadcast their own local news bulletins from the Bendigo or Ballarat stations. Both stations also make sure to watermark everything that airs with their own logos — at a larger scale than the Seven and Nine logos. The pay television service Austar is also available to the residents of Maryborough.

Sport
The town has an Australian Rules football team competing in the major Bendigo Football League and another two other teams, Maryborough Rovers and Royal Park, competing in the minor Maryborough Castlemaine District Football League.

Maryborough has a soccer club with local teams competing in Under 9, Under 13, and Under 17 competitions, and a senior team that competes in the Ballarat & District Soccer Association. There are also both social and competitive Futsal competitions held throughout the year.

Maryborough Harness Racing Club conducts regular meetings at its racetrack located at nearby Carisbrook.

Golfers play at the course of the Maryborough Golf Club on Park Road.

There are three cricket clubs in Maryborough. The Colts Phelans Cricket Club, the M.K.M. Cricket Club, and the Maryborough Cricket all compete in the Maryborough District Cricket Association.

Maryborough, after years of having a strong competition in grass hockey, folded in 2013, leaving them with only the one team competing in the B women level in the Hockey Central Vic in Bendigo. Maryborough were premiers 2011 and 2012.

In basketball, the Maryborough Blazers compete in the Country Basketball League North East league, with a team in both the men's and women's competitions.  Australian NBA athlete, Matthew Dellavedova who currently plays for the Cleveland Cavaliers, grew up in Maryborough.

Notable people

 Phillip Adams – Australian farmer, broadcaster, and public intellectual 
 Jed Adcock – former professional footballer in the Australian Football League (AFL) for the Brisbane Lions
 Ron Branton – former professional footballer as player and captain in the VFL for Richmond Football Club
 Karl Chandler – Standup Comedian, Podcaster, Comedy writer, cofounder of the Koh Samui international podcast festival
 Troy Chaplin – former professional footballer in the AFL for the Richmond Tigers
 Stewart Crameri – former professional footballer in the AFL for Essendon Football Club, Western Bulldogs and Geelong Cats
 Matthew Dellavedova – professional basketball player in the National Basketball Association (NBA) for the Sacramento Kings
 Edmund Herring – Lieutenant General in the Second Australian Imperial Force, Chief Justice of Victoria, and Lieutenant Governor of Victoria
 John Nicholls – former professional footballer as player and captain in the AFL for Carlton Football Club
 Alfred Richard Outtrim – Politician in the Parliament of Victoria from 1895 to 1920
 Lauren Butler – professional footballer in the AFL Women's (AFL) for the Collingwood Magpies

Cemetery
The cemetery is located at Wright Street Maryborough Vic 3465  (Coordinates ) Information on the interments, with more details – here.

Infrastructure

Transport
Maryborough is connected to both Ararat and Elphinstone via the Pyrenees Highway, with connections to the capital Melbourne and Northern Victoria and beyond.

Maryborough station is located on the Mildura railway line. In 2007 the station underwent a $1.2 million upgrade to conduct vital repairs to the historic bell tower, clock and roof which was built in 1890.

In 1895 American writer Mark Twain visited the town and remarked about the station upon his visit.

Don't you overlook that Maryborough station, if you take an interest in governmental curiosities. Why, you can put the whole population of Maryborough into it, and give them a sofa apiece, and have room for more. You haven't fifteen stations in America that are as big, and you probably haven't five that are half as fine. Why, it's perfectly elegant. And the clock! Everybody will show you the clock. There isn't a station in Europe that's got such a clock. It doesn't strike—and that's one mercy. It hasn't any bell; and as you'll have cause to remember, if you keep your reason, all Australia is simply bedamned with bells.''

Daily train services to and from Ballarat, with onward connections to Melbourne's Southern Cross station commenced in 2010.

The Avoca railway line is to be reopened (as of 2017) ultimately to connect Mildura with Portland with standard gauge track.

The city also has coach and bus services that connect to various parts of the city with connections to Melbourne and other parts of Victoria.

The local library was fitted with a 30 kW solar system in late 2012.

See also
 Maryborough Airport
 Energy Breakthrough
 Maryborough, Queensland
Maryborough meteorite

Further reading 
 Turton, K.W., "Maryborough as a Railway Centre," Australian Railway Historical Society Bulletin, September 1962.

References

External links

 
 

 
Towns in Victoria (Australia)
Mining towns in Victoria (Australia)
Populated places established in 1854
1854 establishments in Australia